James William Tibbs  (27 October 1855 – 17 February 1924) was a New Zealand school principal, and made a significant contribution to the development of secondary education in that country He served as headmaster of Auckland Grammar School from 1893 to 1922.

He was born in Hobart, Tasmania, Australia, in 1855. He was buried at Purewa Cemetery in the Auckland suburb of Meadowbank.

In the 1923 King's Birthday Honours, Tibbs was appointed a Companion of the Order of St Michael and St George, for services to education.

References

1855 births
1924 deaths
New Zealand schoolteachers
Australian emigrants to New Zealand
Burials at Purewa Cemetery
New Zealand Companions of the Order of St Michael and St George
Heads of schools in New Zealand